The Pakistan cricket team toured England in July 2021 to play three One Day International (ODI) and three Twenty20 International (T20I) matches. The ODI series formed part of the inaugural 2020–2023 ICC Cricket World Cup Super League.

Ahead of the ODI series, the England squad were forced to self-isolate following positive tests for COVID-19, with Ben Stokes named as their ODI captain. In response, the Pakistan Cricket Board (PCB) were satisfied by the response from the England and Wales Cricket Board (ECB) with regards to following COVID-19 protocols. England won the first two ODI matches to win the series with a game to spare. England then won the third ODI by three wickets to win the series 3–0. Pakistan won the first T20I match by 31 runs. England went on to win the next two matches to win the series 2–1.

Squads

On 24 June 2021, Haider Ali was withdrawn from Pakistan's squad, after breaching the bio-secure bubble at the 2021 Pakistan Super League tournament. Sohaib Maqsood was named as his replacement. On 8 July 2021, Pakistan's Haris Sohail was ruled of the ODI matches due to hamstring injury.

On 3 July 2021, England's squad was named for the ODI series. However, on 6 July 2021, it was announced that seven individuals, three squad members and four support staff, had tested positive for COVID-19. Therefore the whole team was forced to isolate. Ben Stokes was named as the captain, with a new squad announced later the same day.

Practice match
Prior to the ODI series, the Pakistan team were scheduled to play two 50-over intra-squad practice matches. However, the second match was cancelled due to rain.

ODI series

1st ODI

2nd ODI

3rd ODI

T20I series

1st T20I

2nd T20I

3rd T20I

Notes

References

External links
 Series home at ESPN Cricinfo

2021 in English cricket
2021 in Pakistani cricket
International cricket competitions in 2021
Pakistani cricket tours of England